Hanabi may refer to:
 , the Japanese word for fireworks
 Hanabi (card game), a French fireworks-themed cooperative card game

In film:
 Hana-bi, a film by Takeshi Kitano

In music:
 "Hanabi", a song by MUCC from their album Kyūtai
 "Hanabi", a song by Ayumi Hamasaki from her single H and her album Rainbow
 "Hanabi: episode II", a song by Ayumi Hamasaki from her single &
 "Hanabi", a song by Mr. Children from their album Supermarket Fantasy
 "Yoru Hanabi", a song by BeForU
 "Kingyo Hanabi", a single by Ai Otsuka
 "After Hanabi-Listen to my beats", a song by Nujabes
In primatology:
Hanabi-Ko, the full name of Koko the Gorilla.

In popular culture:
 Hanabi, a playable character in the mobile MOBA game, Mobile Legends: Bang Bang